Pretty Sick is an American indie rock band from New York City, New York. It currently consists of vocalist and bassist Sabrina Fuentes, drummer Eva Kaufman, and bassist Orazio Argentero.

Despite the band's long presence and tight-knit fanbase, especially in the Lower East Side area, it is only in recent years that they have garnered recognition from major national publications such as i-D, Nylon, and Pigeons and Planes. In May 2020, Pretty Sick signed to the British record label Dirty Hit, known for acts such as The 1975 and beabadoobee. The group has primarily performed throughout the greater New York City area and more recently around London. 

In February 2021, the band produced the theme song to the ongoing variety series, Story of my Fucking Life, created by Manon Macasaet.

The band's debut album, Makes Me Sick Makes Me Smile was released on Dirty Hit on September 30, 2022. Pretty Sick supported the release with a 23-date headline tour of the US in October and November 2022.

Artistry
Pretty Sick's music is now primarily rooted in alternative-rock, grunge, riot grrrl, and post-punk, while their earlier music was considered far more indie-rock. Over the years, the production style has become increasingly gritty and dark.

Their music videos are equally notable for their transgressive nature, marked by bloody car-crashes, operating rooms, and erotic aggression.

Discography

Studio albums

Studio EPs

Self-released EPs

Singles

Other appearances

References

2014 establishments in the United States
American alternative rock groups